Hypolycaena is a butterfly genus in the family Lycaenidae. Hypolycaena species are found in the Australasian, Indomalayan and Afrotropical realms.

Species
Hypolycaena alcestis (Grose-Smith, 1889)
Hypolycaena amabilis (de Nicéville, [1895])
Hypolycaena amanica Stempffer, 1951
Hypolycaena anara Larsen, 1986
Hypolycaena antifaunus (Westwood, 1851)
Hypolycaena asahi Okubo, 2007
Hypolycaena auricostalis (Butler, 1897)
Hypolycaena buxtoni Hewitson, 1874
Hypolycaena clenchi Larsen, 1997
Hypolycaena coerulea Aurivillius, 1895
Hypolycaena condamini Stempffer, 1956
Hypolycaena danis (C. & R. Felder, [1865])
Hypolycaena dubia Aurivillius, 1895
Hypolycaena erasmus Grose-Smith, 1900
Hypolycaena erylus (Godart, [1824])
Hypolycaena hatita Hewitson, 1865
Hypolycaena irawana (H. Hayashi, Schröder & Treadaway, 1984)
Hypolycaena ithna Hewitson, 1869

Hypolycaena jacksoni Bethune-Baker, 1906
Hypolycaena kadiskos Druce, 1890
Hypolycaena kakumi Larsen, 1997
Hypolycaena lebona (Hewitson, 1865)
Hypolycaena liara Druce, 1890
Hypolycaena lochmophila Tite, 1967
Hypolycaena merguia (Doherty, 1889)
Hypolycaena naara Hewitson, 1873
Hypolycaena narada Kunte, 2015
Hypolycaena nigra Bethune-Baker, 1914
Hypolycaena nilgirica Moore, [1884]
Hypolycaena obscura Stempffer, 1947
Hypolycaena ogadenensis Stempffer, 1946
Hypolycaena pachalica Butler, 1888
Hypolycaena phemis Druce, 1895
Hypolycaena philippus (Fabricius, 1793)
Hypolycaena phorbas (Fabricius, 1793)
Hypolycaena schroederi H. Hayashi, 1984
Hypolycaena schubotzi Aurivillius, 1923
Hypolycaena scintillans Stempffer, 1957
Hypolycaena shirozui (H. Hayashi, 1981)
Hypolycaena similis Dufrane, 1945
Hypolycaena sipylus Felder, 1860
Hypolycaena tearei Henning, 1981
Hypolycaena thecloides (C. & R. Felder, 1860)
Hypolycaena toshikoae H. Hayashi, 1984
Hypolycaena vanavasa (Fruhstorfer, 1909)
Hypolycaena xenia (Grose-Smith, 1895)

External links

Hypolycaena at Markku Savela's Lepidoptera and Some Other Life Forms
, 2011. On Hypolycaena from Maluku, Indonesia, including the first description of male Hypolycaena asahi (Lepidoptera, Lycaenidae). ZooKeys 115: 53–84. 

Hypolycaenini
Lycaenidae genera
Taxa named by Baron Cajetan von Felder
Taxa named by Rudolf Felder